Goro may refer to:

Places

Benin 
 Goro, Benin, an arrondissement in the Commune of Tchaourou, Borgou

Ethiopia 
 Ejersa Goro, a town in Misraq Hararghe Zone, Oromia
 Goro, Bale, a town in Bale Zone, Oromia
 Goro, Mirab Shewa, a town in Mirab Shewa Zone, Oromia
 Goro, Oromia (woreda), a woreda in Bale Zone of Oromia Region
 Goro, Oromia, Debub Mirab Shewa (woreda), a woreda in Debub Mirab Shewa of Oromia Region
 Goro, SNNPR (woreda), a woreda in Southern Nations, Nationalities and Peoples Region

Italy 
 Goro, Emilia–Romagna, a comune in the Province of Ferrara

New Caledonia 
 Goro, New Caledonia, a community in South Province

People with the name
, Japanese ski jumper
, Japanese singer
, Japanese film director
, Japanese table tennis player
, Japanese anime director
, Japanese painter
, Japanese footballer and manager

Characters
 Goro (Mortal Kombat), a character in the Mortal Kombat video game series
 Goro Akechi, a character in the video game Persona 5
 Goro Daimon, a character in the King of Fighters video game series
 Goro Majima, a character from the Yakuza video game series
 Goro, a role in the opera Madama Butterfly
 Goro, the U.S. name of Nyamco in Mappy
 Goro, a character in the anime Darling in the Franxx
 Goro, a character in the video game Dark Cloud
 Goro Hoshino, a character in the Chōriki Sentai Ohranger
 Goro Makiba, a character in the Grendizer
 Goro Sakurai, a character in the J.A.K.Q. Dengekitai
 Goro Yura, a character in the Kamen Rider Ryuki
 Goro Takemura, a character in the video game Cyberpunk 2077
 Gorou (五郎), a character in the video game Genshin Impact

Other
 Goro (sweet bread), a Norwegian sweet bread

See also
 Goroawase

Japanese masculine given names